Ortholepis baloghi is a moth of the family Pyralidae. It was described by Herbert H. Neunzig in 2003. It is found in North America, including Michigan. It is found in the prairie fen habitat.

The wingspan is about 13 mm.

References

Moths described in 2003
Phycitini